Peter Kilfoyle (born 9 June 1946) is a British Labour Party politician who was the Member of Parliament (MP) for Liverpool Walton from 1991 to 2010.

Early life
The eleventh of fourteen children born to an Irish Catholic family on Merseyside, Kilfoyle was educated by the Irish Christian Brothers at St. Edward's College in Liverpool; his father died when he was 10 years old. Obtaining 4 A-levels he went to the University of Durham, but left after a year, becoming a labourer for five years. He qualified as a teacher at Christ's College in Liverpool. From 1975 to 1985, he worked as a teacher. From 1986 to 1991, he was North West Regional Organiser for the Labour Party, often involved in dealing with the entryist tactics of the Militant group.

Parliamentary career
Kilfoyle became the Labour Member of Parliament for Liverpool Walton by retaining the seat in a by-election in 1991 following the death of the incumbent Eric Heffer. In 1994, he supported Tony Blair's campaign for the Labour Party leadership in the leadership election following the death of incumbent John Smith.

When Labour returned to government in 1997, Kilfoyle was initially appointed to a role within the Cabinet Office, with a licence to speak out in the media on the Government's behalf, and was later appointed a junior minister in the Ministry of Defence. In 2000 he resigned, asserting that the Blair Government was failing to pay enough attention to Labour's heartlands. He then became a vocal backbench critic of the Government for the remainder of his time in parliament.

On 18 March 2003, Kilfoyle wrote the amendment against war in Iraq and moved the amendment in the debate in the House of Commons. Despite a large rebellion, the combined Government and official Opposition vote sanctioned war.

In 2005, Kilfoyle allegedly defied the Official Secrets Act when he was said to have passed on information supposedly detailing then U.S. President George W. Bush's plan to bomb an Arabic TV station.

He spoke against government plans to replace the Trident nuclear missile in the debate on 14 March 2007.

In 2008, Kilfoyle advocated a Labour Party leadership challenge to Prime Minister Gordon Brown.

On 23 February 2010, Kilfoyle announced that he would stand down at the 2010 General Election.

In the 2012 England and Wales Police and Crime Commissioner elections, he stood in the Labour nomination race to represent Merseyside Police; he was defeated for nomination by another former Liverpool MP, Jane Kennedy. In July 2014, he broke with official party policy to come out in support of Scottish independence and the SNP.

Personal life
He married Bernadette Slater on 27 July 1968, and they have five children. He is a patron of the British Heart Foundation following a heart attack in 2006 and quadruple bypass surgery.

He is a lifelong supporter of Everton FC.

Books
Left behind : lessons from Labour's heartland (Politicos, 2000) 
Lies, Damned Lies, and Iraq (Harriman House, 2007) 
Labour Pains: How the party I love lost its soul (Biteback, 2010)

References

External links

Official Website (as archived 2009-08-31)
Guardian Unlimited Politics - Ask Aristotle: Peter Kilfoyle MP
TheyWorkForYou.com - Peter Kilfoyle MP
BBC Politics Profile
BBC Democracy Profile

1946 births
Living people
Alumni of Durham University
Alumni of Liverpool Hope University
English people of Irish descent
Labour Party (UK) MPs for English constituencies
Members of the Parliament of the United Kingdom for Liverpool constituencies
Politicians from Liverpool
UK MPs 1987–1992
UK MPs 1992–1997
UK MPs 1997–2001
UK MPs 2001–2005
UK MPs 2005–2010
People educated at St Edward's College